The Immanuel Church Highlands is an Episcopal church in Wilmington, Delaware, in the United States.

References

External links
 

Episcopal church buildings in Delaware
Churches in Wilmington, Delaware
Churches completed in 1914
1914 establishments in the United States
Gothic Revival architecture in Delaware
Gothic Revival church buildings in Delaware